Sebzor  (Russian and Tajik: Себзор, formerly Uvoq) is a village in Sughd Region, northern Tajikistan. It is part of the jamoat Bunjikat in Shahriston District.

Notes

References

Populated places in Sughd Region